Firm Roots may refer to:
Firm Roots (Cedar Walton album), (Muse, 1974)
Firm Roots (Clifford Jordan album), (SteepleChase, 1975)
Firm Roots, Silent Poets album, (Toy's Factory, 1996)